The Waltons is an American television series that ran from 1972 to 1981.

The Waltons may also refer to:

 The Waltons (UK band), an anarcho-punk band from the Isle of Wight
 The Waltons (Canadian band), an alternative rock band from Saskatchewan
 Walton family, the wealthiest family in America
 Walton sextuplets, all-female sextuplets born in 1983